Ann Lennox  (born 25 December 1954) is a Scottish singer-songwriter, political activist and philanthropist. After achieving moderate success in the late 1970s as part of the new wave band the Tourists, she and fellow musician Dave Stewart went on to achieve international success in the 1980s as Eurythmics. Appearing in the 1983 music video for "Sweet Dreams (Are Made of This)" with orange cropped hair and wearing a man's business suit, the BBC states, "all eyes were on Annie Lennox, the singer whose powerful androgynous look defied the male gaze". Subsequent hits with Eurythmics include "There Must Be an Angel (Playing with My Heart)" and "Here Comes the Rain Again".

Lennox embarked on a solo career in 1992 with her debut album, Diva, which produced several hit singles including "Why" and "Walking on Broken Glass". The same year, she performed "Love Song for a Vampire" for Bram Stoker's Dracula. Her 1995 studio album, Medusa, includes cover versions of songs such as "No More 'I Love You's and "A Whiter Shade of Pale". To date, she has released six solo studio albums and a compilation album, The Annie Lennox Collection (2009). With eight Brit Awards, which includes being named Best British Female Artist a record six times, Lennox has been named the "Brits Champion of Champions". She has also collected four Grammy Awards and an MTV Video Music Award. In 2002, Lennox received a Billboard Century Award; the highest accolade from Billboard. In 2004, she received the Golden Globe and the Academy Award for Best Original Song for "Into the West", written for the soundtrack to the feature film The Lord of the Rings: The Return of the King.

Lennox's vocal range is contralto. She has been named "The Greatest White Soul Singer Alive" by VH1 and one of The 100 Greatest Singers of All Time by Rolling Stone. In 2012, she was rated No. 22 on VH1's 100 Greatest Women in Music. In June 2013 the Official Charts Company called her "the most successful female British artist in UK music history". , including her work with Eurythmics, Lennox had sold over 80 million records worldwide. As part of a one-hour symphony of British Music, Lennox performed "Little Bird" during the 2012 Summer Olympics closing ceremony in London. At the 2015 Ivor Novello Awards, Lennox was made a fellow of the British Academy of Songwriters, Composers and Authors (The Ivors Academy), the first woman to receive the honour. Lennox and her Eurythmics partner Dave Stewart were inducted into the Songwriters Hall of Fame in 2020, and the duo were inducted into the Rock and Roll Hall of Fame in 2022.

In addition to her career as a musician, Lennox is also a political and social activist, raising money and awareness for HIV/AIDS as it affects women and children in Africa. She founded the Sing campaign in 2007 and founded a women's empowerment charity called The Circle in 2008. In 2011, Lennox was appointed an OBE by Queen Elizabeth II for her "tireless charity campaigns and championing of humanitarian causes". On 4 June 2012, she performed at the Queen's Diamond Jubilee Concert in front of Buckingham Palace. In 2017, Lennox was appointed Glasgow Caledonian University's first female chancellor.

Early life
Annie Lennox was born on Christmas Day 1954 in Aberdeen, Scotland. She is the daughter of Dorothy Farquharson (née Ferguson; 1930–2003) and Thomas Allison Lennox (1925–1986).

In the 1970s, Lennox won a place at the Royal Academy of Music in London, where she studied the flute, piano and harpsichord for three years. She lived on a student grant and worked at part-time jobs for extra money. Lennox was unhappy and doubted her own talent when compared to her student contemporaries while at the Royal Academy and deliberated on what other direction she could take.

Lennox's flute teacher's final report stated: "Ann has not always been sure of where to direct her efforts, though lately she has been more committed. She is very, very able, however." Two years later, Lennox reported to the academy: "I have had to work as a waitress, barmaid, and shop assistant to keep me when not in musical work." She also played and sang with a few bands, such as Windsong, during the period of her course. In 2006, the academy made her an honorary Fellow. Lennox also was made a Fellow of the Royal Scottish Academy of Music and Drama that year.

Career

1976–1990: Dragon's Playground, the Tourists and Eurythmics

In 1976, Lennox was a flute player with a band called Dragon's Playground, leaving before they appeared on ITV's talent show New Faces. From 1977 to 1980, she was the lead singer of the Tourists, a British pop band and her first collaboration with Dave Stewart.

Lennox and Stewart's second collaboration, the 1980s synth-pop duo Eurythmics, resulted in her most notable fame, as the duo's alto, soul-tinged lead singer. Early in Eurythmics' career, Lennox was known for her androgyny, wearing suits and once impersonating Elvis Presley. Eurythmics released a long line of hit singles in the 1980s, including "Sweet Dreams (Are Made of This)" (a U.S. number one and UK number two), "There Must Be an Angel (Playing with My Heart)" (UK number one), "Love Is A Stranger", "Here Comes the Rain Again", "Sisters Are Doin' It for Themselves", "Who's That Girl?", "Would I Lie to You?" (Australian number one), "Missionary Man" (Grammy Award for Best Rock Performance by a Duo or Group), "You Have Placed a Chill in My Heart", "Thorn in My Side", "The Miracle of Love" and "Don't Ask Me Why". Although the Eurythmics never officially disbanded, Lennox made a fairly clear break from Stewart in 1990. Thereafter, she began her solo career.

Lennox and Stewart reconvened Eurythmics in the late 1990s, resulting in the 1999 release of Peace, the band’s first album of new material in ten years. A subsequent concert tour was completed, with profits going to Greenpeace and Amnesty International. Lennox has received eight Brit Awards, including being named Best British Female Artist a record six times. Four of the awards were given during her time with Eurythmics, and another was given to the duo for Outstanding Contribution to Music in 1999.

The 1988 single "Put a Little Love in Your Heart" was a duet with Al Green recorded for the soundtrack of the movie Scrooged. Though it was produced by Dave Stewart, it was credited to Lennox and Green. This one-off single peaked at No. 9 on the U.S. Billboard Hot 100, 6 in Australia, and was a top 40 hit in the UK. Lennox performed the song "Ev'ry Time We Say Goodbye", a Cole Porter song, that same year for a cameo appearance in the Derek Jarman film Edward II. She then appeared with David Bowie and the surviving members of Queen at 1992's Freddie Mercury Tribute Concert at London's Wembley Stadium, performing "Under Pressure".

1992–1993: Diva

Lennox began working with former Trevor Horn protégé Stephen Lipson, beginning with her 1992 solo debut album, Diva. It was a commercial and critical success, charting No. 1 in the UK, No. 7 in Australia, No. 6 in Germany, and No. 23 in the U.S. where it went double platinum. Lennox's profile was boosted by Diva singles, which included "Why" and "Walking on Broken Glass". "Why" won an MTV Award for Best Female Video at the 1992 MTV Video Music Awards, while the video for "Walking on Broken Glass", set in the Rococo period, featured actors Hugh Laurie and John Malkovich. "Little Bird" also formed a double A-side with "Love Song for a Vampire", a soundtrack cut for Francis Ford Coppola's 1992 movie Bram Stoker's Dracula. The B-side of her single "Precious" was a self-penned song called "Step by Step", which was later a hit for Whitney Houston for the soundtrack of the film The Preacher's Wife. The song "Keep Young and Beautiful" was included on the CD release as a bonus track (the original vinyl album had only ten tracks).

The album entered the UK album chart at no.1 and has since sold over 1.2 million copies in the UK alone, being certified quadruple platinum. It was also a success in the US where it was a top 30 hit and has sold in excess of 2,700,000 copies. In 1993, the album was included in Q magazine list of the "50 Best Albums of 1992". Rolling Stone magazine (25 June 1992, p. 41) described the album as "...state-of-the-art soul pop..." and it is included in Rolling Stone's (13 May 1999, p. 56) "Essential Recordings of the 90's" list. The album won Best British Album at the 1993 Brit Awards.

1995–2000: Medusa and return to Eurythmics

Although Lennox's profile decreased for a period because of her desire to bring up her two children outside of the media's glare, she continued to record. Her second album, Medusa, was released in March 1995. It consisted solely of cover songs, all originally recorded by male artists including Bob Marley, The Clash, and Neil Young. It entered the UK album chart at No. 1 and peaked in Australia at No. 5, and in the US at number 11, spending 60 weeks on the Billboard 200 chart and selling over 2,000,000 to date in the United States. It has achieved double platinum status in both the UK and the US. The album yielded four UK singles: "No More 'I Love You's (which entered the UK singles chart at No. 2, Lennox's highest ever solo peak), "A Whiter Shade of Pale", "Waiting in Vain" and "Something So Right". The album was nominated for Best Pop Vocal Album at the Grammy Awards of 1996, losing to Turbulent Indigo by Joni Mitchell, however, Lennox won the Grammy Award for Best Female Pop Vocal Performance for the single "No More 'I Love You's. Although Lennox declined to tour for the album, she did perform a large scale one-off concert in New York's Central Park, which was filmed and later released on home video. Lennox provided an extensive solo vocal performance (without lyrics) for the soundtrack score of the film Apollo 13 in 1995.

Managed by Simon Fuller since the beginning of her solo career, he said that Lennox played an important but unheralded role in the success of the Spice Girls, encouraging the group to "ham up" their characters, which helped them top the charts around the world. In 1997, Lennox re-recorded the Eurythmics track "Angel" for the Diana, Princess of Wales: Tribute album, and also recorded the song "Mama" for The Avengers soundtrack album. In 1998, following the death of a mutual friend (former Tourists member Peet Coombes), she re-united with Dave Stewart. Following their first performance together in eight years at a record company party, Stewart and Lennox began writing and recording together for the first time since 1989. This resulted in the album Peace. The title was designed to reflect the duo's ongoing concern with global conflict and world peace. The record was promoted with a concert on the Greenpeace vessel Rainbow Warrior II, where they played a mixture of old and new songs. "I Saved the World Today" was the lead single, reaching number eleven on the UK singles chart. Another single, released at the beginning of 2000, "17 Again", made the UK top 40, and topped the US dance chart. In 2002, Lennox received a Billboard Century Award; the highest accolade from Billboard magazine, with Editor-in-Chief Timothy White describing her as one of "the most original and unforgettably affecting artists in the modern annals of popular music."

2003–2007: Bare and work in Africa

In 2003, Lennox released her third solo album, Bare. The album peaked at No. 3 in the UK, No. 10 in Australia, and No. 4 in the US – her highest-charting album in the US to date. She embarked on her first tour as a solo artist to promote the album. The tour, simply titled Solo Tour, pre-dated the release of the album and visited both the US and Europe, with only a two-night stop in the UK at Saddler's Wells Theatre in London. The album has been certified Gold in both the UK and the US and was nominated for Best Pop Album at the 46th Grammy Awards. The album was released with a DVD which included interviews and acoustic versions of songs by Lennox.

In 2004, Lennox won the Academy Award for Best Song for "Into the West" from the film The Lord of the Rings: The Return of the King, which she co-wrote with screenwriter Fran Walsh and composer Howard Shore. Lennox performed the song live at the 76th Academy Awards. The song also won a Grammy award and a Golden Globe award. She had previously recorded "Use Well the Days" for the movie, which incorporates a number of quotations from Tolkien in its lyrics. This features on a bonus DVD included with the "special edition" of the movie's soundtrack CD. In mid-2004, Lennox embarked on an extensive North American tour with Sting. In July 2005, Lennox performed at Live 8 in Hyde Park, London, along with Madonna, Sting, and other popular musicians.

In 2005, Lennox and Stewart collaborated on two new songs for their Eurythmics compilation album, Ultimate Collection, of which "I've Got a Life" was released as a single in October 2005. The promotional video for the song features Lennox and Stewart performing in the present day, with images of past Eurythmics videos playing on television screens behind them. The single peaked at number fourteen in the UK Singles Chart and was a number-one US Dance hit. On 14 November 2005, Sony BMG repackaged and released Eurythmics' back catalogue as 2005 Deluxe Edition Reissues. Lennox also collaborated with Herbie Hancock doing the song "Hush, Hush, Hush" on his collaboration album, Possibilities in August 2005.

2007–2008: Songs of Mass Destruction and AIDS activism

Ending her long association with Stephen Lipson, Lennox's fourth solo album, Songs of Mass Destruction, was recorded in Los Angeles with veteran producer Glen Ballard (known for producing Alanis Morissette's album, Jagged Little Pill). It was released on 1 October 2007, and was the last studio album of Lennox's contract with BMG. It peaked at No. 7 in the UK and No. 9 in the US. Lennox stated that she believed the album consisted of "twelve strong, powerful, really emotive songs that people can connect to". If she achieves that, she says, "I can feel proud of [it], no matter if it sells ten copies or 50 million." Lennox described it as "a dark album, but the world is a dark place. It's fraught, it's turbulent. Most people's lives are underscored with dramas of all kinds: there's ups, there's downs – the flickering candle." She added, "Half the people are drinking or drugging themselves to numb it. A lot of people are in pain."

The album's first single was "Dark Road", released on 24 September 2007. Another song on the album, "Sing", is a collaboration between Lennox and 23 prominent female artists: Anastacia, Isobel Campbell, Dido, Céline Dion, Melissa Etheridge, Fergie, Beth Gibbons, Faith Hill, Angelique Kidjo, Beverley Knight, Gladys Knight, k.d. lang, Madonna, Sarah McLachlan, Beth Orton, Pink, Kelis, Bonnie Raitt, Shakira, Shingai Shoniwa, Joss Stone, Sugababes, KT Tunstall, and Martha Wainwright. The song was recorded to raise money and awareness for the HIV/AIDS organisation Treatment Action Campaign. Included among the group of vocalists are TAC activist members' own vocal group known as The Generics, whose CD of music inspired Lennox to make "Sing". To promote Songs of Mass Destruction, Lennox embarked on a primarily North American tour called Annie Lennox Sings, which lasted throughout October and November 2007.

2008–2009: The Annie Lennox Collection and departure from Sony

Finishing out her contract with Sony BMG, Lennox released the compilation album The Annie Lennox Collection. Initially intended for release in September 2008, the release date was pushed back several months to allow Lennox to recuperate from a back injury. The compilation was eventually released in the US on 17 February 2009, and in the UK and Europe on 9 March 2009. Included on the track listing are songs from her four solo albums, one from the Bram Stoker's Dracula soundtrack, and two new songs. One of these is a cover of Ash's single, "Shining Light". The other is a cover of a song by the English band Keane, originally the B-side of their first single in 2000. Lennox renamed the song from its original title "Closer Now" to "Pattern of My Life". A limited 3-disc edition of the album included a DVD compilation featuring most of Lennox's solo videos since 1992, and also featured a second CD of rarer songs including a version of R.E.M.'s "Everybody Hurts" with Alicia Keys and Lennox's Oscar-winning "Into the West" from the third Lord of the Rings film. The album entered the UK Album Chart at No. 2 and remained in the top 10 for seven weeks.

Lennox's recording contract with Sony BMG concluded with the release of Songs of Mass Destruction and the subsequent retrospective album The Collection, and much was made in the press in late 2007/early 2008 about the apparent animosity between Lennox and the record company. Lennox stated that while on a trip to South Africa in December 2007 to appear at the 46664 campaign in Johannesburg, the regional company office of the label failed to return phone calls and e-mails she made to them for three weeks, and had completely failed to promote the Sing project as planned. Upon her return to the UK, Lennox met with the head of Sony BMG UK, Ged Docherty, who was "mortified" by the problems she had encountered with the South African branch. However, the debacle (partly inflamed when Lennox's dissatisfaction with the South African office was made public on her blog) led to press reports falsely stating that she was being dropped by Sony BMG. The record company themselves quickly refuted the rumour stating that Lennox's contract with them had merely been fulfilled and that they hoped she would consider remaining with them. The British tabloid, Daily Mirror, subsequently printed a retraction of its story about her being dropped by the label.

2010–2013: Island Records and A Christmas Cornucopia

 
In August 2010, Lennox signed a new contract with Island Records in the UK and Decca Records in the US (both part of the Universal Music Group). Her first release was a Christmas album entitled A Christmas Cornucopia, issued on 15 November 2010. The album is a collection of Lennox's interpretations of traditional festive songs such as "Silent Night" and "The First Noel", along with one new composition, "Universal Child", which was released as a download-only single on 13 October 2010. Lennox had previously showcased the song on the American Idol Gives Back TV show in April 2010. She sang the song "Angels from the Realms of Glory" from the album for the TNT special Christmas in Washington.

A music video was produced for a second single from the album, "God Rest Ye Merry Gentlemen". Lennox also performed the track on the UK chat show Loose Women in December 2010, and was also interviewed. According to Metacritic, A Christmas Cornucopia has gained "generally favourable reviews". Ian Wade of BBC Music gave the album a very positive review, saying "this collection could find itself becoming as much a part of the holiday season as arguments with loved ones." Sal Cinquemani of Slant Magazine awarded the album 3.5/5 and said "Lennox seems more inspired on A Christmas Cornucopia than she has in years." John Hunt of Qatar Today magazine gave the album 9/10 and said "in particular, the vocal work and musical arrangement of 'God Rest Ye Merry Gentlemen' are impactful to the point of being intimidating."

On 4 June 2012, Lennox performed, as part of the Queen's Diamond Jubilee Concert, in front of Buckingham Palace in London and on 12 August she performed "Little Bird" at the 2012 Summer Olympics Closing Ceremony.

2014–2019: Nostalgia
In October 2014, Lennox released her sixth solo album, Nostalgia. The album is a collection of Lennox's childhood favourite soul, jazz and blues songs. Critic Mike Wass of Idolator stated that Lennox "puts her own inimitable spin" on the selected tracks. The lead single "I Put a Spell on You" received its first radio play on 15 September 2014 by Ken Bruce on BBC Radio 2. Upon release, the album entered the UK and US Top 10, and reached number one on the US Billboard Top Jazz Albums chart. The album was nominated for a Grammy Award for Best Traditional Pop Vocal Album. On 28 January 2015, Lennox performed a live concert at the Orpheum Theatre in Los Angeles entitled An Evening of Nostalgia with Annie Lennox. The show aired on PBS in the US in April 2015, and was released on DVD and Blu-ray internationally in May 2015.

2019–present: Lepidoptera
In May 2019, Lennox released Lepidoptera, an EP containing four extemporised piano songs. The album serves as a companion piece to her art installation "Now I Let You Go..." at MASS moca. It is Lennox's first independently distributed record.

Public image

Charity and political activism

Lennox appeared on stage at the 1988 Nelson Mandela 70th Birthday Concert and commenced activist work with the Sing Foundation afterwards. In 1990, Lennox recorded a version of Cole Porter's "Ev'ry Time We Say Goodbye" for the Cole Porter tribute album Red Hot + Blue, a benefit for AIDS awareness. A video was also produced. Lennox has been a public supporter of Amnesty International and Greenpeace for many years, and she and Dave Stewart donated all of the profits from Eurythmics' 1999 Peacetour to both charities. Concerned by Tibet freedom, she supported Amnesty International campaigns for the release of Tibetan prisoners Palden Gyatso and Ngawang Choephel.

Lennox was a signatory to the "No war on Iraq" campaign started in 2003, her album "Songs of Mass Destruction" and her rendition of "Dark Road" were deeply critical of the war. In conversation with Melvyn Bragg in 2006, she expressed her anger at how the UK was misled over Iraq's alleged 'weapons of mass destruction'.

After being forced to pull out of performing at Live Aid held at Wembley Stadium in 1985 due to a serious throat infection, Lennox appeared at Live 8 held in Hyde Park, London in 2005. In 2006, in response to her humanitarian work, Lennox became patron of the Master's Course in Humanitarian and Development Practice for Oxford Brookes University. In October 2006, Lennox spoke at the British House of Commons about the need for children in the UK to help their counterparts in Africa. On 25 April 2007, Lennox performed "Bridge over Troubled Water" during the American Idol "Idol Gives Back" fundraising drive. Lennox's 2007 song "Sing" was born out of her involvement with Nelson Mandela's 46664 campaign and Treatment Action Campaign (TAC), both of which are human rights groups which seek education and health care for those affected by HIV. In December 2007, Lennox established The SING Campaign, an organisation dedicated to raising funds and awareness for women and children affected by HIV and AIDS.

On 11 December 2007, she performed in the Nobel Peace Prize Concert in Oslo, Norway together with a variety of artists, which was broadcast to over 100 countries. Lennox appeared at the Nelson Mandela 90th Birthday Tribute in June 2008 and then led a rally against the Gaza War in London on 3 January 2009.

In 2008, Lennox founded The Circle of Women, known as The Circle, a private charitable organisation to network and fund-raise for women's projects around the world.

Lennox opened the 2009 Edinburgh Festival of Politics with commentary on Pope Benedict XVI's approach to HIV/AIDS prevention in Africa. She said that the Pope's denunciation of condoms on his recent tour of Africa had caused "tremendous harm" and she criticised the Roman Catholic Church for causing widespread confusion on the continent. Lennox also condemned the media's obsession with "celebrity culture" for keeping the AIDS pandemic off the front page. During her address, Lennox wore a T-shirt emblazoned with the words "HIV positive". Lennox wore similar T-shirts at the 25th Anniversary Rock & Roll Hall of Fame concert at Madison Square Garden on 30 October 2009, during her appearance on The Graham Norton Show on 30 November 2009 (where she performed the new song "Full Steam", a duet with singer David Gray), during a recorded performance for American Idol during a 21 April 2010 fundraiser, entitled Idol Gives Back, and during a performance on the live Comic Relief show on 18 March 2011.

 In June 2010, Lennox was named as a UNESCO Goodwill Ambassador for AIDS, a role that continues . Lennox also works with other organisations such as Oxfam, Amnesty International and the British Red Cross in regard to the issue. Lennox also supports the Burma Campaign UK, a non-governmental organisation that addresses the suffering in Burma and promotes democratisation.

In December 2010, it was confirmed that Lennox was in the New Years Honours List and would become an Officer of the Order of the British Empire (OBE) in recognition of her humanitarian work. She received the award from Queen Elizabeth II at Buckingham Palace on 28 June 2011.

In November 2013, Lennox received the Music Industry Trusts Award for her career achievements in music and her charity commitments. Elton John said of her award; "It is so well deserved and not only for your extraordinary contribution to music and songwriting but also for your outstanding and tireless work as an HIV and AIDS activist and supporter of women's rights," while Adele stated; "Annie Lennox has been a constant part of my life. An example of a brilliant talent that exudes excellence and influence on everyone."

In 2015, Lennox attended, performed at and hosted several charitable events including: the 50th Amnesty International Annual Conference where she was a guest speaker, Elton John and David Furnish's at home Gala in aid of the Elton John Aids Foundation where she performed, held a screening of He Named Me Malala, and hosted a Mothers2mothers 15th Anniversary gala. In 2016 Lennox was awarded the Elle Style Awards 'Outstanding Achievement' award, and the Royal Scottish Geographical Society award, the Livingstone Medal, in recognition of her outstanding contribution to the fight against AIDS and support of women's rights.

Relationship with the LGBTQ+ community

Lennox's longtime support for LGBT rights has helped garner a significant following within the LGBTQ+ community. According to The Advocate, "her distinctive voice and provocative stage persona have made Lennox a longtime gay icon."

Known for her androgynous look in the 1980s–first widely seen in the 1983 music video for "Sweet Dreams (Are Made of This)" where she had close-cropped, orange-coloured hair, and wore a man's suit brandishing a cane, a video which made her a household name–Lennox was viewed as the female version of Boy George. They appeared together on the front cover of the British music magazine Smash Hits in December 1983 with the headline "Which one is the boy?". This was followed by Newsweek magazine in the US who ran an issue which featured Lennox and George on the cover of its 23 January 1984 edition with the caption Britain Rocks America – Again, marking the Second British Invasion. The following month Lennox impersonated Elvis Presley at the 1984 Grammy Awards.

Exhibition
In conjunction with the Victoria and Albert Museum in London, Lennox put many items from her collection—costumes, accessories, photographs, awards, ephemera from her political campaigns, and personal belongings—on display. This collection, which spanned her entire career, along with music videos and interviews, became The House of Annie Lennox at the institution from 15 September 2011 to 26 February 2012. An expanded version of the exhibit was later installed at The Lowry in Salford, England from 17 March 2012 to 17 June, before moving to Aberdeen for twelve weeks.

Other work
On 31 March 2014, British retailer Marks & Spencer launched the new iteration of its 'Leading Ladies' marketing campaign featuring influential British women, which included Lennox, Emma Thompson, Rita Ora and Baroness Lawrence.

Music videos

 

Both as part of Eurythmics and in her solo career, Lennox has made over 60 music promo videos. The 1987 Eurythmics album Savage and her 1992 solo album Diva were both accompanied by video albums, both directed by Sophie Muller. The music video for "Missionary Man" featured stop-animation techniques and received five nominations at the 1987 MTV Video Music Awards. Actors Hugh Laurie and John Malkovich appeared in the music video for "Walking on Broken Glass" in period costume, while the video for "Little Bird" paid homage to the different images and personas that have appeared in some of Lennox's previous videos. The clip features Lennox performing on stage with several lookalikes (male and female) that represent her personas from "Why", "Walking on Broken Glass", "Sweet Dreams", "Beethoven (I Love To Listen To)", "I Need a Man", "Thorn in My Side", "There Must Be an Angel", and even her stage image from the 1992 Freddie Mercury Tribute Concert.

Personal life
Lennox has been married three times. 

She and Dave Stewart were in a relationship for three years in the late 1970s, before they formed the Eurythmics.

Her first marriage, from 1984 to 1985, was to German Hare Krishna devotee Radha Raman.

From 1988 to 2000, Lennox was married to Israeli film and record producer Uri Fruchtmann and they lived in The Grove, Highgate. The couple have two daughters, Lola and Tali. A son, Daniel, was stillborn in 1988.

While fundraising in 2009, Lennox met Mitch Besser and his wife who had started an AIDS charity in Africa. Besser had divorce proceedings brought against him after his relationship with Lennox became public. On 15 September 2012 Lennox married Besser at a private ceremony in London. Besser is the brother of Richard E. Besser.

In September 2012 Lennox featured in Series 9 of the BBC's Who Do You Think You Are?, in which she discovered that her great-great-grandmother Jessie Fraser worked at the Broadford Flax Mill in Aberdeen. Her maternal grandmother, Dora Paton, was a dairy maid at the Balmoral Royal Estate and her maternal grandfather, William Ferguson, was a gamekeeper also at Balmoral.

Both of Lennox's parents died of cancer. Lennox is agnostic and a feminist. Lennox became a vegetarian at age 29. In the 2010 Sunday Times Rich List of British millionaires from the world of music, Lennox was estimated to have a fortune of £30 million.

Discography

Studio albums
 Diva (1992)
 Medusa (1995)
 Bare (2003)
 Songs of Mass Destruction (2007)
 A Christmas Cornucopia (2010)
 Nostalgia (2014)

Compilation albums
• The Annie Lennox Collection (2009)

Awards and nominations
Lennox has received a variety of major awards during her career:

ASCAP Pop Music Awards
{| class="wikitable plainrowheaders" style="width:70%"
|-
! scope="col" style="width:4%;" | Year
! scope="col" style="width:35%;" | Category
! scope="col" style="width:44%;" | Nominee(s)
! scope="col" style="width:6%;" | Result
! scope="col" style="width:3%;" | Ref
|-
| 1994
| Most Performed Song
| "Walking on Broken Glass"
| 
|

Academy Awards

Billboard Music Awards
{| class="wikitable plainrowheaders" style="width:70%"
|-
! scope="col" style="width:4%;" | Year
! scope="col" style="width:56%;" | Category
! scope="col" style="width:35%;" | Nominee(s)
! scope="col" style="width:6%;" | Result
! scope="col" style="width:6%;" | Ref
|-
| 2002
| Century Award
| rowspan=2|Herself
| 
| 
|-
| rowspan=2  |2004
| Top Hot Dance Club Play Artist
| 
| rowspan="2" |
|-
| Top Hot Dance Club Play Single
| "A Thousand Beautiful Things"
|

Brit Awards

British LGBT Awards
{| class="wikitable plainrowheaders" style="width:70%"
|-
! scope="col" style="width:4%;" | Year
! scope="col" style="width:46%;" | Category
! scope="col" style="width:45%;" | Nominee(s)
! scope="col" style="width:6%;" | Result
! scope="col" style="width:6%;" | Ref
|-
| 2015
| rowspan=3 | Herself
| Best Music Artist
| 
|
|-
| 2017
| rowspan=2|Celebrity Ally
| 
|
|-
| 2018
| 
|

Golden Globe Awards

Grammy Awards
Solo

With Eurythmics

Hungarian Music Awards
{| class="wikitable plainrowheaders" style="width:70%"
|-
! scope="col" style="width:4%;" | Year
! scope="col" style="width:46%;" | Category
! scope="col" style="width:45%;" | Nominee(s)
! scope="col" style="width:6%;" | Result
! scope="col" style="width:6%;" | Ref
|-
| rowspan=2 | 1993
| Best Foreign Album
| rowspan=2 | Diva
| 
| rowspan=2 |
|-
| Best Foreign Video
|

MTV Video Music Awards

 American Music Awards
2008 – AMA Award of Merit for her work and her humanitarian efforts

 Ivor Novello Awards
1984 – Songwriter of the Year for Lennox and Dave Stewart
1987 – Songwriter of the Year for Lennox and Dave Stewart
1987 – Best contemporary song ("Its Alright, (Baby's Coming Back)")
1993 – Best Song ("Why")

 honorary degrees and awards
1986 – Associate – Royal Academy of Music London
1997 – Fellowship – Royal Academy of Music London
2006 – Honorary Doctor of Music – The Royal Scottish Academy of Music and Drama
2006 – Fellowship – Edinburgh College of Art
2009 – Honorary Doctorate at the University of Edinburgh (awarded 20 October 2009), in recognition of her work in the field of HIV/AIDS, and her success as a recording artist.
2011 – Honoured by the university for her International Humanitarian Efforts – Glasgow Caledonian University  
2012 – Honorary Degree  – Open University of Scotland
2013 – Honorary Degree – Williams College 
2013 – Honorary Doctorate in Music – Berklee College of Music 
2013 – Honorary Degree – University of Essex

 Other awards/titles/ambassadorships
2002 – Billboard Century Award by Billboard
2008 – OUT magazine honoured Lennox for her work in the HIV and AIDS field. The top 100 most influential people in Gay Culture.
2008 – The British Red Cross Services to Humanity Award
2008 – Glamour magazine Inspirational Woman of the Year Award
2008 – Honoured at the 2008 Youth AIDS Gala, for her contribution in helping the fight against HIV and AIDS
2008 – The German Sustainability "special achievement" award for her commitment in the fight against HIV and AIDS
2008 – Webby Award for official website www.annielennox.com
2009 – Save the Children "Amigo de los Niños" Award
2009 – Awarded the "Freedom of the City of London" by the British Red Cross for services to humanity in the field of HIV and AIDS
2009 – Nobel Peace Laureates for services to humanity
2010 – Patron of the Elton John AIDS Foundation
2010 – Special Envoy for HIV/AIDS in Scotland
2010 – Ambassador for HIV/AIDS in London
2010 – UNAIDS Goodwill Ambassador
2010 – Barclays Women of the Year Award
2010 – International Service Award for Global Defence of Human Rights
2010 – GQ Charity Woman of the Year Award
2010 – Harper's Bazaar Lifetime Achievement Award
2010 – Appointed an Officer of the Order of the British Empire (OBE) for her work fighting AIDS and poverty in Africa
2013 – Music Industry Trust Award (MITS) for her creativity and work that inspires those who work within the music business and millions of others worldwide
2016 – Elle Style Awards – Outstanding Achievement Award
2016 – Awarded Livingstone Medal by Royal Scottish Geographical Society 
2016 – Harper's Bazaar Philanthropy Award
2020 – Songwriters Hall of Fame inductee (with Dave Stewart)
2022 – Rock and Roll Hall of Fame (Eurythmics)

References

External links

 
 
 Annie Lennox in libraries (WorldCat catalogue)
 

Annie Lennox
19 Recordings artists
1954 births
20th-century Scottish women singers
21st-century Scottish women singers
Alumni of the Royal Academy of Music
Arista Records artists
Best Original Song Academy Award-winning songwriters
Brit Award winners
British synth-pop new wave musicians
Decca Records artists
Eurythmics members
Women new wave singers
Feminist musicians
Golden Globe Award-winning musicians
Grammy Award winners
Fellows of the Royal Academy of Music
HIV/AIDS activists
Island Records artists
Ivor Novello Award winners
Scottish LGBT rights activists
Living people
Officers of the Order of the British Empire
People educated at Harlaw Academy
Musicians from Aberdeen
RCA Records artists
Scottish activists
Scottish agnostics
Scottish contraltos
Scottish electronic musicians
Scottish feminists
Scottish new wave musicians
Scottish pop singers
Scottish rock singers
Scottish women singer-songwriters
Scottish soul singers
Torch singers
Universal Music Group artists
British women in electronic music
People associated with Glasgow Caledonian University
Ballad musicians
Fellows of the Royal Scottish Geographical Society
The Tourists members
Fellows of the Royal Society of Edinburgh
Androgynous people